An inspectorate or inspectorate-general (or general inspectorate) is a civil or military body charged with inspecting and reporting on some institution or institutions in its field of competence. Inspectorates cover a broad spectrum of organizations which vary in a number of terms, notably whether and to the degree to which they become involved in criminal investigations; the extent to which they achieve independence from the institutions being inspected; as well as the nature of their inspection regimes and reporting processes.

Inspectorates are commonplace in government; for example, in the United States, there are some 73 standard form Office of the Inspector Generals charged with examining the actions of a government agency, military organization, or military contractor as a general auditor of their operations and headed by an inspector general. Inspectorates in various jurisdictions oversee civil activities such as mining and the nuclear industry. Many regulatory agencies incorporate inspectorate functions relating to markets and the companies operating in those markets.

Belgium
 Flemish Care Inspectorate

The Netherlands
 Health Care Inspectorate

UK
 His Majesty's chief inspector

 Active Travel England
 Chief Inspector of the UK Border Agency
 His Majesty's Inspectorate of Constabulary
 HM Crown Prosecution Service Inspectorate
 Drinking Water Inspectorate
 Employment Agency Standards Inspectorate
 Fish Health Inspectorate
 HM Inspectorate of Mines
 Planning Inspectorate
 His Majesty's Chief Inspector of Education, Children's Services and Skills
 His Majesty's Chief Inspector of Prisons
 HM Inspectorate of Probation
 His Majesty's Railway Inspectorate – now superseded by the Railway Safety Directorate of the Office of Rail Regulation, the director of which is known as the Chief Inspector of Railways

Scotland
 Care Inspectorate (Social Care and Social Work Improvement Scotland)
 His Majesty's Inspectorate of Education (Scotland)
 His Majesty's Chief Inspector of Prisons for Scotland

Wales
 Care and Social Services Inspectorate Wales
 Care Standards Inspectorate for Wales
 Chief Inspector of Education and Training in Wales
 Healthcare Inspectorate Wales

Northern Ireland
 Education and Training Inspectorate, Northern Ireland

Vietnam 
 Government Inspectorate

Military branches